Lago di Bomba, also called Lago di Sangro, is a lake in the Province of Chieti, Abruzzo, Italy. To the south of the lake is Villa Santa Maria and to the north of the lake is Bomba.

References 

Lakes of Abruzzo